Jane Cutler Greenspan was a justice of the Supreme Court of Pennsylvania.

She was born in 1948. Greenspan earned her bachelor's degree at Smith College (1970) and Juris Doctor at Rutgers University School of Law, Camden (1973). She served as a law clerk for Robert N. C. Nix Jr. before becoming an assistant district attorney in Philadelphia, Pennsylvania. Greenspan served as a judge of the Pennsylvania Court of Common Pleas from 1987 to 2008. She was then appointed as a justice of the Supreme Court of Pennsylvania on July 2, 2008, following the resignation of Ralph Cappy. Greenspan resigned from the bench in December 2009.

See also 

 Supreme Court of Pennsylvania
 List of justices of the Supreme Court of Pennsylvania

References 

Justices of the Supreme Court of Pennsylvania
Rutgers University alumni
1948 births
Smith College alumni
Rutgers School of Law–Camden alumni
20th-century American judges
21st-century American judges
Living people
20th-century American women judges
21st-century American women judges